Roberto Castillo may refer to:
 Roberto Castillo (philosopher) (1950–2008), Honduran philosopher and writer
 Roberto Castillo Udiarte (born 1951), Mexican poet
 Roberto Castillo Sandoval (born 1957), Chilean author and professor
 Roberto Castillo (footballer) (born 1984), Chilean football striker